Dmitrovskaya is a station of the Serpukhovsko-Timiryazevskaya Line of the Moscow Metro. It was opened in 1991, and is named for the highway leading to the town of Dmitrov. The station is a pylon-trivault.

The station has a connection to the Dmitrovskaya railway station which serves the Rizhsky suburban railway line and Line D2 of Moscow Central Diameters.

Moscow Metro stations
Railway stations in Russia opened in 1991
Serpukhovsko-Timiryazevskaya Line
Railway stations located underground in Russia